Francisco Di Franco (born 28 January 1995) is an Argentine professional footballer. He is right footed, and plays as a striker for Dnipro-1.

Career

Club career
Di Franco made his league debut for Boca Juniors during the 2012/13 season. He played two games that season.

References

External links 

Living people
1995 births
Sportspeople from Buenos Aires Province
Argentine footballers
Boca Juniors footballers
Tlaxcala F.C. players
Argentine expatriate footballers
Expatriate footballers in Mexico
Argentine expatriate sportspeople in Mexico
Expatriate footballers in Cyprus
Argentine expatriate sportspeople in Cyprus
Apollon Limassol FC players
AEZ Zakakiou players
FC Karpaty Lviv players
SC Dnipro-1 players
Atlético Tucumán footballers
Ukrainian Premier League players
Expatriate footballers in Ukraine
Argentine expatriate sportspeople in Ukraine
Association football forwards